Daniel Arthur Smith (born October 2, 1973) is a Canadian actor and musician.

Life and career
Smith was born in Montreal, Quebec and moved to Pickering, Ontario at age seven. After high school productions of Joseph and the Amazing Technicolor Dreamcoat (Joseph), The Little Shop of Horrors (Seymour), and The Wizard of Oz (The Cowardly Lion), he began working at Stage West in Mississauga, spending over a year doing dinner theatre.  He went on to study and perform at The Second City in Toronto, working with SCTV legend Joe Flaherty.  This led to various television  and film roles.  He also wrote and performed the theme song to the TV series Big Wolf on Campus.

Smith appeared on the CBS game show The Price Is Right on March 27, 2001.  He won throughout the show including the Showcase where he took home US$31,000 worth of prizes (including a car).

After Big Wolf on Campus ended in 2002, Smith starred in the film The Bail; however, that film went unreleased.  After The Bail (alternately titled Fizzy Bizness), Smith moved to Los Angeles to pursue a musical career.  From 2003 to 2009, Danny was the singer/songwriter/guitarist for the band The City Drive.  The band parted ways in 2009, and Danny returned to Toronto and is pursuing his acting career.  In 2010 he started appearing in commercials for Telus, including one in 2011 where he appears with Leonard Nimoy.

Filmography

References

External links
 

1973 births
Living people
Anglophone Quebec people
Male actors from Montreal
Male actors from Ontario
Canadian male film actors
Canadian male television actors
People from Pickering, Ontario